Bjørn Aamodt (24 February 1944 – 29 April 2006) was a Norwegian seaman, industrial worker and poet.

Biography
Aamodt was born in Bærum and died in Oslo, Norway. The son of artist and footballer Asbjørn Aamodt, he graduated artium at Valler Gymnasium in 1962 and later studied psychology at the University of Oslo, where he graduated in 1975. Between 1962 and 1972, he  worked as a sailor and dockworker. He was later employed as a crane operator and metal worker.

He made his literary debut with the poetry collection Tilegnet in 1973. Aamodt was awarded Gyldendal's Endowment jointly with Kjersti Scheen in 1994, the Halldis Moren Vesaas Prize in 1997, and the Dobloug Prize in 2003. He was twice nominated for the Nordic Council's Literature Prize in 1995 for ABC  and again in 1998 for Anchorage.

Selected works
 Tilegnet  - 1973
Knuter, Mulm og andre dikt  - 1980
Stå  - 1990
ABC - 1994 
Anchorage  - 1997
Atom  - 2002
Arbeidsstykker og atten tauverk   - 2004
 Avskjed  - 2010

References

1944 births
2006 deaths
Writers from Oslo
University of Oslo alumni
20th-century Norwegian poets
Norwegian male poets
Writers from Bærum
20th-century Norwegian male writers
Dobloug Prize winners